CBCN  may refer to:

 Catholic Bishops Conference of Nigeria, an Episcopal Conference of the Roman Catholic Church
 CBCN-FM, the North Bay rebroadcaster of CBCS-FM
 Chiropractic Board of Clinical Nutrition, a specialty council of the American Chiropractic Association